The San Francisco Ethics Commission is a public agency tasked with maintaining city bylaws [clarification needed, there is no "city" bylaws, each Board or Commission or policy body has its own bylaws] in San Francisco, California. The commission specifically files and audits campaign finance disclosure statements, handles campaign consultant registration and regulation. They also handle lobbyist registration and regulation along with the filing of officer for statements of economic interest and the administration of the Whistleblower program. Lastly, they mitigate investigations of ethics complaints, enforce education and training and provide advice and statistical reporting.

The San Francisco Ethics Commission oversees multiple good governance policies for the City & County of San Francisco. Issues covered include oversight and public reporting of campaign finance; the registration of campaign consultants, lobbyists, and permit expeditors; and conflicts of interest reporting. 

It also enforces these issues, including by issuing fines. The Commission can also issue policy recommendations and directly place relevant measures on the ballot.
The Commission appoints an Executive Director who, in turn, hires staff to carry out the agency’s day-to-day work.

Establishment
The Ethics Commission was placed on the ballot by seven members of the Board of Supervisors. Supervisors Angela Alioto, Sue Bierman, Terrance Hallinan, Kaufman, Susan Leal, Carol Migden, and Kevin Shelly supported it. Supervisors Conroy, Hsieh, Willie B. Kennedy, and Bill Maher opposed it.

The measure was placed on the November 1993 ballot, known as Proposition K. 

The measure was supported by the county Democratic Party, the Chamber of Commerce, the Labor Council, Common Cause, and many other political leaders.

It was opposed by a committee named Citizens Against Putting the Foxes in Charge of the Hen Coop and the San Francisco Taxpayers Association. The latter included future Ethics Commissioner Quentin Kopp, then a State Senator, who authored the ballot handbook’s paid argument against Proposition K. Regardless, the measure passed.

Notable Rulings

Supervisor Mark Farrell
In 2014, then-Supervisor (and future Interim Mayor) Mark Farrell was fined $190,903.04 for illegal coordination between his campaign committee and another third party.

Supervisor Eric Mar
Former Supervisor Eric Mar was fined for accepting tickets to events in public lands in his District.  He later admitted to not understanding the rules.

References

External links

County government agencies in California
Ethics Commission
Government of San Francisco